Valbuena de Pisuerga is a municipality located in the province of Palencia, Castile and León, Spain. According to the 2004 census (INE), the municipality had a population of 68.

References

Municipalities in the Province of Palencia